Starokatayevo (İśke Qatay) is a rural locality (a selo) in Novokatayevsky Selsoviet, Bakalinsky District, Bashkortostan, Russia. The population was 543 as of 2010. There are 12 streets.

Geography 
Starokatayevo is located 10 km east of Bakaly (the district's administrative centre) by road. Novokatayevo is the nearest rural locality.

References 

Rural localities in Bakalinsky District